Batman Or.Atchariya (แบ็ทแมน อ.อัจฉริยะ), formerly known as Nuathoranee Samchaivisetsuk (เหนือธรณี สามชัยวิเศษสุก) is a Thai Muay Thai fighter.

Biography
Thanachon Suksai grew up in the Si Muang Mai district, Ubon Ratchathani Province where he started Muay Thai at the age of 9 with his uncle and his older brother at a local boxing camp in his hometown. He was fighting under the name Beerthai Sit.Jaboon before changing to Rakhangphet. After graduating from high school, he used the name Nuathoranee Samchaivisetsuk for his debut at Lumpinee Stadium.

When Nuathoranee was still fighting in Ubon Ratchathani he started to enter the ring wearing a Batman mask with his cornerman dressed as Spiderman. The idea was to attract the youth of the area to his camp and make a name among boxing fans. Nuathoranee still uses the mask for his entrances in Bangkok stadiums earning him the nickname "Batman".

On November 30, 2019 Nuathoranee rematched Sakachainoi M.U.Den who previously beat him. Nuathoranee dominated the fight to a unanimous decision win, capturing the vacant Lumpinee Stadium lightweight title in the process.

Batman went undefeated throughout 2020 and was part of the 5 fighters shortlisted for the Thailand Sports Authority Fighter of the Year award.

On March 7, 2021 Batman defeated Thanonchai Fairtex by unanimous decision at the Channel 7 Stadium for the vacant lightweight title.

Titles and accomplishments
Lumpinee Stadium
 2019 Lumpinee Stadium 135 lbs Champion
Channel 7 Stadium
 2020 Channel 7 Stadium Fighter of the Year
 2021 Channel 7 Stadium 135 lbs Champion

Fight record

|-  style="background:#fbb;"
| 2023-02-10|| Loss ||align=left| Duangsompong Jitmuangnon || ONE Friday Fights 4, Lumpinee Stadium || Bangkok, Thailand || Decision (majority) || 3 || 3:00
|-  style="background:#fbb;"
| 2022-12-17|| Loss ||align=left| Kongsuk Suanluangrotyok || Samui Super Fight: Ruamponkon Samui, Phetchbuncha Stadium || Koh Samui, Thailand || Decision ||5 ||3:00 
|-  style="background:#fbb;"
| 2022-11-06|| Loss||align=left| Kongsuk Suanluangrotyok || Kiatpetch, Channel 7 Stadium || Bangkok, Thailand ||  Decision ||5 ||3:00 
|-
! style=background:white colspan=9 |

|-  style="background:#cfc;"
| 2022-09-17|| Win ||align=left| Thanonchai Fairtex || Ruamponkon Samui + Kiatpetch Samui Fight, Petchbuncha Stadium || Koh Samui, Thailand || TKO (Doctor stoppage) ||4 || 
|-  style="background:#cfc;"
| 2022-08-22|| Win ||align=left| Rungsaengtawan Sor.Parat || Ruamponkon Samui + Kiatpetch Samui Fight, Petchbuncha Stadium || Koh Samui, Thailand || Decision ||5 ||3:00 
|-  style="background:#cfc;"
| 2022-05-07|| Win ||align=left| Nakrob Fairtex || Fairtex Fight, Lumpinee Stadium || Bangkok, Thailand || KO (High kick)  || 1 || 0:28 
|-  style="background:#cfc;"
| 2022-03-27|| Win ||align=left| Nakrob Fairtex || Kiatpetch, Channel 7 Stadium || Bangkok, Thailand || Decision (Split)  ||5 ||3:00 
|-
! style=background:white colspan=9 |

|-  style="background:#cfc;"
| 2022-01-02|| Win ||align=left| Nakrob Fairtex || Kiatpetch, Channel 7 Stadium || Bangkok, Thailand || Decision (Unanimous) || 5||3:00 
|-
! style=background:white colspan=9 |

|-  style="background:#fbb;"
| 2021-11-26|| Loss ||align=left| Petchdam Petchyindee Academy || Muay Thai Moradok Kon Thai + Rajadamnern Super Fight|| Buriram Province, Thailand || Decision || 5 || 3:00

|-  style="background:#cfc;"
| 2021-10-31|| Win ||align=left| Mongkolkaew Sor.Sommai || Channel 7 Stadium || Bangkok, Thailand || Decision || 5|| 3:00

|-  style="background:#cfc;"
| 2021-03-07|| Win ||align=left| Thanonchai Fairtex || Kiatpetch, Channel 7 Stadium || Bangkok, Thailand || Decision (Unanimous) || 5|| 3:00
|-
! style=background:white colspan=9 |

|-  style="background:#cfc;"
| 2020-12-06|| Win ||align=left| Songkom Bangkokalaiyon || Channel 7 Stadium || Bangkok, Thailand || Decision || 5|| 3:00

|-  style="background:#cfc;"
| 2020-10-18|| Win ||align=left| Rungsaengtawan Sor.Parat || Channel 7 Stadium || Bangkok, Thailand || Decision || 5|| 3:00

|-  style="background:#cfc;"
| 2020-09-13|| Win ||align=left| Sibsaen Tor.JaroenthongPhuket|| Channel 7 Stadium || Bangkok, Thailand || Decision || 5|| 3:00

|-  style="background:#cfc;"
| 2020-07-19|| Win ||align=left| Songkom Bangkokalaiyon|| Or.Tor.Gor.3 Stadium || Nonthaburi Province, Thailand || Decision || 5|| 3:00

|-  style="background:#cfc;"
| 2020-02-09|| Win ||align=left| Rungsaengtawan Sor.Parat|| Channel 7 Stadium || Bangkok, Thailand || Decision || 5|| 3:00

|-  style="background:#cfc;"
| 2019-11-30|| Win ||align=left| Sakchainoi M.U.Den || Lumpinee Stadium || Bangkok, Thailand || Decision (Unanimous) || 5|| 3:00
|-
! style=background:white colspan=9 |

|-  style="background:#cfc;"
| 2019-10-26|| Win ||align=left| Jomhod Chor.Ketweena|| Lumpinee Stadium || Bangkok, Thailand || KO (Knee to the body) || 3||

|-  style="background:#fbb;"
| 2019-09-15|| Loss ||align=left| Tapaokaew Singmawynn || Samui Festival + Kiatpetch || Ko Samui, Thailand || Decision || 5|| 3:00 
|-
! style=background:white colspan=9 |

|-  style="background:#cfc;"
| 2019-08-03|| Win ||align=left| Yod ET Tded99|| Lumpinee Stadium || Bangkok, Thailand || Decision || 5|| 3:00

|-  style="background:#fbb;"
| 2019-01-13|| Loss ||align=left| Sakchainoi M.U.Den || Channel 7 Stadium || Bangkok, Thailand || TKO (Shoulder injury) || 3||

|-  style="background:#cfc;"
| 2018-12-17|| Win ||align=left| Chai Sor.Jor.Toi Padrew|| Sor.Sommai, Rajadamnern Stadium || Bangkok, Thailand || Decision || 5|| 3:00

|-  style="background:#fbb;"
| 2018-04-21|| Loss ||align=left| Komawut FA Group ||  Omnoi Stadium || Bangkok, Thailand || Decision || 5|| 3:00

|-  style="background:#fbb;"
| 2018-03-18|| Loss ||align=left| Komawut FA Group || Blue Arena || Samut Prakan, Thailand || Decision || 5|| 3:00

|-  style="background:#fbb;"
| 2018-02-02|| Loss ||align=left| Yamin Sor Jor.Wichitpaedriew || Lumpinee Stadium || Bangkok, Thailand || Decision || 5|| 3:00

|-  style="background:#cfc;"
| 2017-11-15|| Win ||align=left| Chai Sor.Jor.Toi Padrew|| Tor.Chaiwat, Rajadamnern Stadium || Bangkok, Thailand || Decision || 5|| 3:00

|-  style="background:#cfc;"
| 2017-08-27|| Win ||align=left| Fahsatan Sit.Watcharachai ||  Rangsit Stadium || Rangsit, Thailand || Decision || 5|| 3:00

|-  style="background:#cfc;"
| 2017-07-23|| Win ||align=left| Raksurin Kesagym || Rangsit Stadium || Rangsit, Thailand || KO (Right Elbow)|| 3||

|-  style="background:#c5d2ea;"
| 2017-06-25|| Draw||align=left| Samingyok Lukchumphon|| Rangsit Stadium || Rangsit, Thailand || Decision || 5|| 3:00

|-  style="background:#fbb;"
| 2017-04-29|| Loss ||align=left| Petchpikhat Kor Klanbut || Rangsit Stadium || Rangsit, Thailand || Decision || 5||3:00

|-  style="background:#cfc;"
| 2017-03-26|| Win ||align=left| Jaruadsuk Kor.Kampanat|| Rangsit Stadium || Rangsit, Thailand || KO (Knees to the body)|| 2||

|-  style="background:#cfc;"
| 2017-03-05|| Win ||align=left| Chalamsuk Nitisamui || Rangsit Stadium || Rangsit, Thailand || Decision || 5|| 3:00

|-  style="background:#cfc;"
| 2017-01-29|| Win ||align=left| Chalamsuk Nitisamui || Rajadamnern Stadium || Bangkok, Thailand || TKO (Punches)|| 2||

|-  style="background:#cfc;"
| 2017-01-07|| Win ||align=left| Phetphadung Phetsimuen || Thanakorn Stadium || Nakhon Pathom Province, Thailand || TKO (Kicks)|| 2||

|-  style="background:#cfc;"
| 2016-08-06|| Win ||align=left| Ruenthai Dabpong || Thanakorn Stadium || Nakhon Pathom Province, Thailand || KO (Knee to the body)|| 4||

|-  style="background:#fbb;"
| 2016-05-07|| Loss ||align=left| Dennapho Sor.Thanyalak  || Rangsit Stadium || Rangsit, Thailand || Decision || 5|| 3:00

|-  style="background:#fbb;"
| 2016-05-01|| Loss ||align=left| PetchSamui Lukjaoporongtom || Muay Dee Vithithai, Rangsit Stadium || Rangsit, Thailand || Decision || 5|| 3:00

|-  style="background:#fbb;"
| 2016-01-02 || Loss ||align=left| Rodtang Jitmuangnon || MAX Muay Thai || Pattaya, Thailand || KO (Punches) || 2 ||

|-
| colspan=9 | Legend:

References

Batman Or.Atchariya
ONE Championship kickboxers 
1995 births
Living people
Batman Or.Atchariya